The 9th Destroyer Flotilla, or Ninth Destroyer Flotilla, was a military formation of the British Royal Navy from January 1913 to December 1925 and again in January to July 1940.

History
Established in January 1913 when it was assigned to the Patrols Command it was based at Chatham. During World War I it remained on Patrolling Duties until 1918. During the inter-war years it was reassigned to the Mediterranean Fleet from 1922 to 1925 it placed in the Atlantic Fleet Reserve and then deactivated. It was reformed during World War II in January 1940 as part of the Home Fleet destroyer flotillas command until July 1940 when it was disbanded.

Administration

Captains (D) afloat, 9th Destroyer Flotilla
Captain (D) afloat is a Royal Navy appointment of an operational commander of a destroyer flotilla or squadron.

References

Sources
 Halpern, Paul (2016). The Mediterranean Fleet, 1919–1929. Cambridge, England: Routledge. .
 Watson, Dr Graham. (2015) "Royal Navy Organization and Ship Deployments 1900-1914". www.naval-history.net. Gordon Smith.
 Watson, Dr Graham. (2015) "Royal Navy Organization and Ship Deployment, Inter-War Years 1914-1918". www.naval-history.net. Gordon Smith.
 Watson, Dr Graham. (2015) "Royal Navy Organization in World War 2, 1939-1945". www.naval-history.net. Gordon Smith.
 Whitby, Michael (2011). Commanding Canadians: The Second World War Diaries of A.F.C. Layard. Vancouver, Canada: UBC Press. .

Destroyer flotillas of the Royal Navy
Military units and formations established in 1913
Military units and formations disestablished in 1940